Manj may refer to:

India
Manjki Region, Punjab
Manj (Ludhiana West), a village in Punjab

Iran
Manj District, a district (bakhsh) in Chaharmahal and Bakhtiari Province
Manj Rural District, a rural district (dehestan) in Manj District
Manj, Chaharmahal and Bakhtiari, a village in Manj Rural District

See also
 Manj Musik, Indian singer-songwriter
 
 Mange (disambiguation)
 Manji (disambiguation)
 Manjhi (disambiguation)
 Monj (disambiguation)